J. Michael Ortiz is an American educator and the 5th president of Cal Poly Pomona. Prior to this appointment on August 1, 2003 Ortiz was professor of education at Appalachian State University and vice president for academic affairs at Fresno State.  He was listed in 2005 as one of the 100 most influential Hispanics in 2005 by Hispanic Business magazine. In 2008 Latino Magazine named him one of the Top 25 Latinos in Education.

Ortiz announced on January 30, 2014 that he would be stepping down as President of Cal Poly Pomona at the end of 2014. He was succeeded by Soraya M. Coley, who served as Provost and Vice President of Academic Affairs of California State University Bakersfield since 2005.

Background
Ortiz's professional leadership activities include:
AASCU Christa McAuliffe Presidential Selection Committee
AASCU Committee on Teacher Education
AASCU Task Force on Sustainability
ACE Commission on Advancement of Racial and Ethnic Equity
American College & University Presidents Climate Commitment Leadership Circle
Aspen Institute Commission on No Child Left Behind
BACCHUS and GAMMA Peer Education Network Board of Trustees
CCAA Presidents/Chancellors Group Board of Directors
California State University (CSU) Agricultural Research Initiative Board of Governors, Vice Chair
CSU Presidents' Council on Underserved Constituencies
California Campus Compact, Executive Board of Directors
DoD/HACU Department of Defense/Hispanic Serving Institution Task Force
North Central Association, Consultant Evaluator
Western Association of Schools and Colleges (WASC), Program Evaluator
USDA/HSI Collaborative Advisory Board

He holds a bachelors, a master's degree from the University of New Mexico and a PhD from the University of North Carolina at Chapel Hill.

Possible departure

On October 27, 2009, Cal Poly Pomona student-run newspaper The Poly Post informed the campus community of Ortiz's possible departure to New Mexico State University.

References

Presidents of California State Polytechnic University, Pomona
Living people
Educators from Greater Los Angeles
21st-century American educators
Year of birth missing (living people)
University of North Carolina at Chapel Hill School of Education alumni